The Mauser 13 mm anti-tank rifle (usually abbreviated T-Gewehr) is the world's first anti-tank rifle—the first rifle designed for the sole purpose of destroying armored targets—and the only anti-tank rifle to see service in World War I.  Approximately 16,900 were produced.

History 
During the First World War the onset of static, trench warfare saw the rise in the use of armour plate for personal defense, and the development and use of armour-piercing ammunition to counter this. Both Britain and Germany used high-powered rifles, such as elephant guns from their African colonies, for this purpose.
The first use of armoured fighting vehicles (tanks) was by the British at the Battle of Flers–Courcelette in September 1916 and were followed by the French.
By June 1917, the German Army faced the Mark IV tank, and found that the standard armour-piercing 7.92 mm K bullet was no longer effective. This prompted the development by the Germans of a heavy-calibre and high-velocity rifle as an anti-tank weapon. The makers of the gun were inspired by weapons used to hunt African big game, like the elephant gun. The Mauser Company responded with the 13mm T-gewehr and began mass production at Oberndorf am Neckar in May 1918. The first of these off the production lines were issued to specially raised anti-tank detachments.

14,700 T-Gewehrs were produced before the Armistice, and production ceased in April 1919. Approximately 1,490 were produced after the cessation of hostilities.

Operation 
The rifle was a single-shot bolt-action rifle using a modified Mauser action, with rounds manually loaded into the chamber. The weapon had a pistol grip and bipod, but no method of reducing recoil, such as a soft buttpad or muzzle brake. This could cause problems for the shooter with repeated firing. The iron sights were composed of a front blade and tangent rear, graduated in 100-meter increments from 100 to 500 meters.  The rifle was operated by a two-man crew of a gunner and ammunition bearer, who were both trained to fire the weapon. Due to the tremendous blunt force of the recoil, it was designed to be shot in a static position, either prone or from inside a trench.

Post-war service 
The United States Army tested the T-Gewehr after the war, as did the other Allied Powers. Poland obtained a few T-Gewehrs during border skirmishes at the German border in 1920.

The Reichswehr kept some M1918s in service into the 1930s (805 were in the secret arsenals of the Reichswehr in 1925). Sweden bought a number from Germany, and used them under the designation Pansarvärnsgevär m/21. During the Rif War, the Rifian rebels obtained some smuggled Mauser 1918s to counter the Spanish Renault and Schneider tanks.

In 1939, a Soviet team led by V.N. Shokolov retro-engineered the T-Gewehr, modified to fire the Soviet 12.7×108mm B-32 bullets. Small numbers were hand-produced by the Bauman Institute in the emergency of July 1941. After the Winter War, Finland bought 100 T-Gewehr from Great Britain but they were never used and Finland scrapped them in 1944.

Cartridge 

The armour-piercing hardened steel cored 13.2×92mm (.525-inch) semi-rimmed cartridge, often simply called "13 mm", was originally planned for a new, heavy Maxim MG.18 water-cooled machine gun, the Tank und Flieger (TuF) meaning for use against "tank and aircraft", which was under development and to be fielded in 1919.

Surviving examples 

Examples of the Mauser 1918 anti-tank rifle can be found in several museums:

 Argentina
 Museo de Armas, Circulo Militar, Buenos Aires
 Museo de Armas, Colegio Militar de la Nación, El Palomar
 Museo de la Ciudad, San Carlos de Bariloche
 Australia
 Army Museum Bandiana in Wodonga
 Queensland Museum, Brisbane
 Mialls Gun Shop, Melbourne
 Australian War Memorial, Canberra
 Rocky Hill War Memorial, Goulburn
 Austria
 Museum of Military History, Vienna
 Belgium
 In Flanders Fields Museum, Ypres
 In Royal Museum of the Armed Forces and Military History, Brussels
 Canada
 On display in the lobby of the McGill club, Montreal, being the gift made in 1919 by a Canadian general
 The Officers and Non-Commissioned Officers Mess of the South Alberta Light Horse in Medicine Hat, Alberta
 The Officers Mess of the Barrack Green Armories in Saint John, New Brunswick
 China 
 In Huaihai Campaign Commemoration Hall, Xuzhou City, Jiangsu Province
 France
 The Musée de l'Armée at the Invalides, Paris
 The Batterie Todt museum near Cape Gris Nez 
 Germany
 Herzog Anton Ulrich Museum in Braunschweig
 Museum im Schwedenbau in Oberndorf am Neckar
 Italy
 The National Museum of Artillery in Turin
 Latvia
 Latvian War Museum
 Luxembourg
 National Museum of Military History in Diekirch
 United Kingdom
 Lancashire Infantry Museum, Preston
 Imperial War Museum, London
 Canterbury Heritage Museum Canterbury
 King's Own Royal Border Regiment museum
 22nd Cheshire Regiment museum
 Royal Armouries Museum in Leeds
 Norwich Castle Museum, Norwich
 Redoubt Fortress and Museum, Eastbourne
 King's Shropshire Light Infantry museum, Shrewsbury castle
 Norris Museum, St Ives, Huntingdonshire
 Heugh Battery Museum, Hartlepool
 Worcester Art Gallery And Museum, Worcester.
 Royal Ulster Rifles Museum, Belfast
 United States
 U.S. Army Armor & Cavalry Collection, Fort Benning
 The National World War I Museum and Liberty Memorial in Kansas City, Missouri
 NRA National Firearms Museum in Fairfax, VA
 Woodrow Wilson Presidential Library, Staunton, VA
 Iowa Gold Star Military Museum, Camp Dodge, Iowa
 Maryland Museum of Military History in Baltimore, Maryland
 North Dakota Heritage Center in Bismarck, North Dakota 
 Clark Brothers gun store Opal Virginia
 Klamath County Museums in Klamath Falls, Oregon 
 International Ordnance Museum in St Jo, Texas
 National Museum of the Marine Corps in Quantico, VA

See also 
Anti-tank rifle
Boys anti-tank rifle
Lahti L-39
Panzerbüchse 39
PTRD-41 ― Mass produced competing design to the PTRS
PTRS-41 ― Mass produced competing design to the PTRD
Solothurn S-18/100
Type 97 automatic cannon
Wz. 35 anti-tank rifle

 MG 18 TuF

References 

 
 .

External links 

 Anti-Tank Rifle History and Collecting
 Small Arms of WWI Primer 022: German T-Gewehr Anti-Tank Rifle
 Mauser Tankgewehr M1918 anti-tank rifle

Anti-tank rifles of Germany
German inventions
Mauser rifles
World War I German infantry weapons
Weapons and ammunition introduced in 1918